The women's 10 metre platform, also reported as platform diving, was one of four diving events on the Diving at the 1984 Summer Olympics programme.

The competition was split into two phases:

Preliminary round (9 August)
Divers performed eight dives. The twelve divers with the highest scores advanced to the final.
Final (10 August)
Divers performed another set of eight dives and the score here obtained determined the final ranking.

Results

References

Sources
 

Women
1984
1984 in women's diving
Div